Microvirga soli  is a Gram-negative, methanol-utilizing, rod-shaped and non-spore-forming bacterium from the genus of Microvirga which has been isolated from forest soil from Sichuan in China.

References

External links
Type strain of Microvirga soli at BacDive -  the Bacterial Diversity Metadatabase

Hyphomicrobiales
Bacteria described in 2017